The 1937–38 İstanbul Football League season was the 30th season of the league. Güneş SK won the league for the first time.

Season

References

Istanbul Football League seasons
Turkey
2